Micheline is a feminine given name. Notable people with the name include:

Micheline Beauchemin (1929 – 2009), Canadian textile artist and weaver
Micheline Bernardini (born 1927), French dancer
Micheline Borghs (born 1956), Belgian fencer
Micheline Calmy-Rey (born 1945), Swiss politician
Micheline Ishay (born 1962), American political theorist
Micheline Jacques (born 1971), French Barthélemois politician
Micheline Lanctôt (born 1947), Canadian actress
Micheline Lannoy (born 1925), Belgian pair skater
Micheline Aharonian Marcom (born 1968), American novelist
Micheline Montreuil, Canadian lawyer and politician
Micheline Patton (1912-2001), Irish actress
Micheline Presle (born 1922), French actress
Micheline Coulombe Saint-Marcoux (1938–1985), Canadian composer
Micheline (singer) (:nl:Mich Van Hautem) (1968) Flemish singer, Micheline Van Hautem from Tadpole (film) soundtrack

French feminine given names